The 1990–91 Full Members' Cup, known as the Zenith Data Systems Cup for sponsorship reasons, was the 6th staging of a knock-out competition for English football clubs in the First and Second Division. The winners were Crystal Palace and the runners-up were Everton.

The competition began on 20 November 1990 and ended with the final on 7 April 1991 at the Wembley Stadium.

In the first round, there were two sections: North and South. In the following rounds each section gradually eliminates teams in knock-out fashion until each has a winning finalist. At this point, the two winning finalists face each other in the combined final for the honour of the trophy.

Arsenal, Liverpool. Tottenham, Manchester United & Aston Villa opted out of this competition.

First round

Northern Section

Southern Section

Second round

Northern Section

Southern Section

Third round

Northern Section

Southern Section

Area semi-finals

Northern Section

Southern Section

Area finals

Northern Area final

Everton beat Leeds United 6–4 on aggregate.

Southern Area final

Crystal Palace beat Norwich City 3–1 on aggregate.

Final

Notes

External links
When Saturday Comes Article on the Full Members' Cup
Full Results

Full Members' Cup
1990–91 in English football